Davis Dam is a dam on the Colorado River about  downstream from Hoover Dam. It stretches across the border between Arizona and Nevada. Originally called Bullhead Dam, Davis Dam was renamed after Arthur Powell Davis, who was the director of the U.S. Bureau of Reclamation from 1914 to 1923. The United States Bureau of Reclamation owns and operates the dam, which was completed in 1951.

Davis Dam impounds the Colorado River and forms Lake Mohave.

Description

Davis Dam
The earth fill dam begins on the Nevada side, but it does not extend to the Arizona side on the east. Instead, there is an inlet formed by earth and concrete, that includes the spillway. The hydroelectric power plant is beside the inlet.

The dam's purpose is to re-regulate releases from Hoover Dam upstream, and facilitate the delivery of Colorado River water to Mexico. Bullhead City, Arizona, and Laughlin, Nevada, are located just below the dam along the river. Davis Camp is also nearby. Bullhead City was originally a construction town for workers building the dam.

A road is located on the crest of the earth fill portion of the dam and a Forebay Bridge spans the Forebay. It was formerly part of Arizona State Route 68 to Nevada. In April 2004, the roadway was shut down to vehicle traffic. Pedestrian and bicycle traffic are permitted. The old roadway is now an extension of the Heritage Trail system. Barriers have been placed on the former road at each end of the earthen dam. The facility is heavily patrolled by security forces who strictly enforce parking regulations.

Davis Dam Hydroelectric Power Plant
The Davis Dam Power Plant is a hydroelectric power plant located on the Arizona side of the dam, beside the inlet. The hydroelectric plant generates between 1 and 2 terawatt-hours of electricity annually.

See also

Dams of the Lower Colorado River Valley
Bullhead City, Arizona
Laughlin, Nevada
List of power stations in the United States

References

External links
USBR - Davis Dam
USBR - Davis Power Plant
USBR - Parker-Davis Project
USGS - Real Time Water Data

Dams on the Colorado River
Earth-filled dams
Dams in Arizona
Dams in Nevada
Dams of the Lower Colorado River Valley
Hydroelectric power plants in Arizona
Dams completed in 1951
United States Bureau of Reclamation dams
Buildings and structures in Clark County, Nevada
Buildings and structures in Mohave County, Arizona
Mojave Desert
Landmarks in Arizona
Landmarks in Nevada
Historic American Engineering Record in Arizona
1951 establishments in Arizona
1951 establishments in Nevada